This is a list of statistical records for the Uzbekistan national football team.

Player records

Players in bold are still active with Uzbekistan.

Most capped players

Top goalscorers

Competitive record

FIFA World Cup

AFC Asian Cup

Asian Games
Football at the Asian Games has been an under-23 tournament since 2002.

Head-to-head record
The list shown below shows the Uzbekistan national football team all-time international record against opposing nations. The stats are composed of FIFA World Cup, AFC Asian Cup, as well as numerous international friendly tournaments and matches.
Details: Uzbekistan national football team all-time record

As of 20 November 2022 after the match against .

FIFA ranking history

 FIFA-ranking yearly averages for Uzbekistan (1994–2022)

See also
 Uzbekistan national football team
 Uzbekistan national football team results – 1990s
 Uzbekistan national football team results – 2000s
 Uzbekistan national football team results – 2010s
 Uzbekistan national football team results (2020–present)
 Uzbekistan national football team non-international results

References

External links
 Uzbekistan national football teams head to head

 
National association football team records and statistics